Mariya Demidova (born 28 August 1996) is a Kazakhstani footballer who plays as a defender and has appeared for the Kazakhstan women's national team.

Career
Demidova has been capped for the Kazakhstan national team, appearing for the team during the 2019 FIFA Women's World Cup qualifying cycle.

References

External links
 
 
 

1996 births
Living people
Kazakhstani women's footballers
Kazakhstan women's international footballers
Women's association football defenders
BIIK Kazygurt players
Kazakhstani people of Russian descent